Chathannoor is a town in the Indian state of Kerala situated at the Kollam District on the banks of Ithikkara River. Shri Diju is the current president of Chathannoor Grama Panchayat

Geography
Chathannoor is well connected to other parts of Kerala by road especially by NH66(formerly NH47). National Highway 66 which connects Panvel, (Mumbai) and Kanyakumari and passes through the centre of  Chathannoor Town. The KSRTC sub centre in Chathannoor offers inter-district services and local services for adjacent villages like Paravur, Chirakkara, Ooyor etc.. FP services to Kottayam, Mundakkayam, Kumili etc are also run by KSRTC

Tourist destination Polachira can be reached by travelling 4 km to the south from town centre. Poothakulam elephant camp is located at Chirakkarathazham, just one km away from Polachira.

The KSRTC bus station and the newly started mini civil station are located at a distance of about one kilometre from Chathannoor junction while travelling towards Trivandrum

Proximity to Hospitals like KIMS, Azeezia, HolyCross, Kollam Medical College, connectivity to other parts of the district and proximity to reputed educational institutions is increasing Chathannoor's demand as a major residential area in the district.

Politics
Chathanoor town comes under Kollam (Lok Sabha constituency). Chathannoor assembly constituency includes one Municipality, Paravur, and six other panchayaths namely Adichanalloor, Chathannoor, Kalluvathukkal, Chirakkara, Poothakkulam and Pooyappally .

Important Offices/Institutions 
Chathannoor Grama Panchayat office,  Ithhikkara Block Office,  KSRTC Sub Depot Chathannoor. Sub Treasury Chathannoor,  Village Office of Meenadu Village,  Excise Office,   Family Health Cente,  AEO Office,  Electricity Office (KSEB)  Spl Tahasildar Office Land acqusituion for NHA, I  Post Office.  BSNL Exchange,  Agriculture Office,  Govt Homeo Dispensary,  Chathannoor Police station, Chathannoor Assistant Commissioner of Police Office,  District Police Forensic office,    Kerala Water Authority Office PWD Office PWD Guest house,  Sub Registrar Office

Temples/churches 
The cultural identity of the location is associated with two ancient and prominent Hindu temples Sree Bhoothanatha Temple and Chenamath Mahadeva Temple out of which the annual festival of Sree Bhoothanatha Temple is celebrated with greater intensity. The annual festival of Sree Bhoothanatha temple is famous for the event called "Eduppukuthira" . Recently the youth have started using the pictures of "Eduppukuthira" as a geographical identity.
 Chathannoor Sree Boothanatha Temple
 Kanjiramvila Bhagavathi Temple
 Ananthagiri Sree Subramanya Swamy Temple Thazham
 Kanjirathumvila Bhagavathi Temple
 Chennamath Shiva Temple
 Vayalunada Bhagavathi Temple
 Varinjam Sree Subramanya Swamy Temple
 Sree Madankave Temple Uramvila
 Meenadu Sree dharmashastha Temple
 Kollakkuzhi Sree Bhaghavathi TempleVarinjam Sree Mahadevar Temple
 Pattupana devi temple koippadu
 Sree Koshnakavu Temple, Edanadu, Chathannoor
 Krungal Valluval Kadiyathi Temple, Kurungal Chathannoor

See also
Koippadu
Chathannoor Assembly constituency - Wikipedia
G. S. Jayalal Chathannoor MLA
https://kollam.nic.in/en/public-utility/chathannoor-post-office/ Post Office

References

External links

Cities and towns in Kollam district